The Kampyle of Eudoxus (Greek: καμπύλη [γραμμή], meaning simply "curved [line], curve") is a curve with a Cartesian equation of

from which the solution x = y = 0 is excluded.

Alternative parameterizations
In polar coordinates, the Kampyle has the equation

Equivalently, it has a parametric representation as

History
This quartic curve was studied by the Greek astronomer and mathematician Eudoxus of Cnidus (c. 408 BC – c.347 BC) in relation to the classical problem of doubling the cube.

Properties
The Kampyle is symmetric about both the x- and y-axes.  It crosses the x-axis at (±a,0).  It has inflection points at

(four inflections, one in each quadrant).

where

is the th Catalan number.

See also
 List of curves

References

External links
 
 

Plane curves